Robert Carson McKessock (born February 2, 1933) is a former politician in Ontario, Canada. He served in the Legislative Assembly of Ontario from 1975 to 1987, as a member of the Liberal Party.

Background
McKessock was born in Chatsworth, Ontario and educated at Georgian College. He worked as a farmer, and was a deacon in the Strathaven Baptist Church.

Politics
He was elected to the Ontario legislature in the 1975 provincial election defeating Progressive Conservative incumbent Eric Winkler by 277 votes in Grey.  The Progressive Conservatives won a minority government in this election, and McKessock served in opposition.  He was re-elected in the elections of 1977 and 1981.

McKessock won a landslide re-election victory in the 1985 campaign.  The Liberals formed a minority government after the election, and McKessock served as Parliamentary Assistant to the Minister of Correctional Services and Solicitor General. He did not seek re-election in 1987 and returned to his farming career.

References

External links

1933 births
Living people
Ontario Liberal Party MPPs
Liberal Party of Canada politicians